Emilia's short-tailed opossum (Monodelphis emiliae) is an opossum species from South America. It is found in Bolivia, Brazil and Peru.

References

Opossums
Mammals of Brazil
Mammals of Peru
Mammals of Bolivia
Mammals described in 1912
Taxa named by Oldfield Thomas